Stenomalina is a genus of insects belonging to the family Pteromalidae.

The species of this genus are found in Europe and Northern America.

Species:
 Stenomalina chloris (Walker, 1836) 
 Stenomalina communis (Nees, 1834)

References

Pteromalidae
Hymenoptera genera